Kerman is the capital city of Kerman Province, Iran.

Kerman or Kirman may also refer to:

Places
Kirman (Sasanian province), province of the Sasanian Empire
Kerman Province, province of Iran
Kerman County
Kerman, California

People 
 Joseph Kerman (1924–2014), American musicologist
 Langston Kerman (born 1986), American actor, writer, and comedian
 Piper Kerman (born 1969), American author
 Aaron Kirman (fl. 2018–2019), American real estate agent
 Richard Kirman Sr. (1877–1959), American politician

Other
Kerman carpet, a type of Persian carpet

See also 
 Kermani (disambiguation)
 Kirmani
 Kermanshah (disambiguation)